The 1965 All-Ireland Senior Football Championship was the 79th staging of the All-Ireland Senior Football Championship, the Gaelic Athletic Association's premier inter-county Gaelic football tournament. The championship began on 2 May 1965 and ended on 26 September 1965.

Limerick rejoin the Munster football championship for the first time since 1952.

The decider was a repeat of the 1964 All-Ireland Senior Football Championship Final, between Galway and Kerry. There was no change in the outcome as Galway defeated Kerry again by 0-12 to 0-09. It was Galway’s second title in succession, on their way to "Three In A Row".

Provincial Championships format changes

Connacht Championship format change

The Connacht championship, instead of the normal system, has two quarter-finals and one semi-final instead of the usual one quarter-final and two semi-finals for just one year. All-Ireland champions Galway received a bye to the Connacht final meaning that Mayo, Roscommon, Sligo and Leitrim would be in separate quarter-finals. The winners of the two games would play in a lone semi-final while the semi-final winner would play Galway.

Leinster Championship format change

The Leinster championship dropped the second round after one year in 1965. The preliminary round winners went on to the quarter-finals.

Results

Connacht Senior Football Championship

Quarter-finals

Semi-final

Final

Leinster Senior Football Championship

Preliminary round

Quarter-finals

Semi-finals

Final

Munster Senior Football Championship

Quarter-finals

Semi-finals

Final

Ulster Senior Football Championship

Preliminary round

Quarter-finals

Semi-finals

Final

All-Ireland Senior Football Championship

Semi-finals

Final

Championship statistics

Miscellaneous

 On 16 May 1965, Seán Treacy Park, Tipperary hosted its first match for 23 years the Munster Quarter-final meeting between Limerick vs Waterford their first meeting between them in 31 years as Limerick get into back in the Munster football championship for the first time since 1952 after recording wins over Waterford and Cork but lost Munster final to Kerry who made an historic 8th Munster title in a row.
 Longford reach their first Leinster final but are beaten by Dublin.
 Galway win the All Ireland title for 2 in a row another 3 in a row of Connacht titles.

Top scorers
Overall

Single game

All-Ireland Senior Football Championship